This is a complete list of lieutenant generals in the United States Space Force. The rank of lieutenant general (or three-star general) is the second-highest rank achievable in the U.S. Space Force, and the first to have a specific number of authorized positions for it set by statute. It ranks above major general (two-star general) and below general (four-star general).

There have been eight lieutenant generals in the United States Space Force, one of whom was promoted to four-star general. All achieved that rank while on active duty in the U.S. Space Force, and all were commissioned via identical paths to Air Force commissioned officers: five via Air Force Reserve Officer Training Corps (AFROTC) at a civilian university, and three via the U.S. Air Force Academy (USAFA).

List of generals
Entries in the following list of lieutenant generals are indexed by the numerical order in which each officer was promoted to that rank while on active duty, or by an asterisk (*) if the officer did not serve in that rank while on active duty in the U.S. Space Force or was promoted to four-star rank while on active duty in the U.S. Space Force. Each entry lists the general's name, date of rank, active-duty positions held while serving at three-star rank, number of years of active-duty service at three-star rank (Yrs), year commissioned and source of commission, number of years in commission when promoted to three-star rank (YC), and other biographical notes (years of birth and death are shown in parentheses in the Notes column). Lieutenant generals of the U.S. Air Force who transferred to the Space Force in the equivalent grade or promoted to grade after transfer to the Space Force are included.

Timeline

Overview

The rank of lieutenant general in the United States Space Force is identical to its equivalents in the Army, Marine Corps and Air Force in that it is strictly ex officio, tied to positions requiring the officeholder to hold said rank. As a result, upon vacating such a position, the officeholder is reduced to their highest permanent grade, but may retain their temporary grade outside of statutory limits for up to 60 days pending reassignment to a position of equal or higher importance.

The first three-star general in the Space Force was B. Chance Saltzman, who was promoted on 14 August 2020 with date of rank on 7 August.

Both initial general officer setups for the Space Force provided for six lieutenant generals in the new service. In December 2022, the James M. Inhofe National Defense Authorization Act for Fiscal Year 2023 codified five lieutenant general billets for the Space Force into Title 10 of the United States Code.

Three-star positions

Three-star generals

See also
 Lieutenant general (United States)
 General officers in the United States
 List of active duty United States four-star officers
 List of active duty United States three-star officers
 List of active duty United States Space Force general officers
 List of United States Space Force four-star generals
 List of United States Army lieutenant generals since 2020
 List of United States Marine Corps lieutenant generals since 2010
 List of United States Navy vice admirals since 2020
 List of United States Air Force lieutenant generals since 2020
 List of United States military leaders by rank
 Staff (military)

References

Notes

United States Space Force generals
United States Space Force
Generals
 
United States Space Force generals